Dakotan may refer to:
 Sioux language, particularly the dialect of the Santee
 Dakotan, a member of the Sioux, especially the Santee tribe
 Dakotan, a branch of the Siouan languages including Sioux, Assiniboine and Stony
 , a 1912 American-Hawaiian ship
 Dakotan (train), a named passenger train of the United States
 Dakotan, of or relating to the Dakota Territory in the United States

See also
 North Dakota
 South Dakota